Scotopteryx coarctaria is a species of moth in the family Geometridae. It is found in most of Europe, except Ireland, Great Britain, Portugal, Belgium, Fennoscandia and the Baltic region. It has also been recorded from Turkey and Kazakhstan.

There are various lines and bands, as well as a conspicuous toothed wavy line found on the forewings. There are probably two generations per year.

The larvae feed on Genista and Cytisus species. The species overwinters in the larval stage.

References

External links
Lepiforum.de

Moths described in 1775
Scotopteryx
Moths of Europe
Moths of Asia
Taxa named by Michael Denis
Taxa named by Ignaz Schiffermüller